The Surgery Ship is a documentary film (2013) directed by Madeleine Hetherton-Miau and documentary television series (2016)  directed by Alex Barry based on the real life events filmed on board the hospital ship the "Africa Mercy". Both single documentary and series were produced by Madeleine Hetherton-Miau and Rebecca Barry, founders of production company Media Stockade 

Both titles are distributed by TVF, an English-based television distribution company.

The single-feature documentary was first commissioned in 2012 by Australian TV broadcaster SBS (Special Broadcast Service). Filming took place when the Africa Mercy was docked in Conakry, Guinea, in 2012–2013. The completed film was broadcast in December 2013 in Australia followed by international festival release in 2014 of the longer feature documentary.

In 2015 National Geographic commissioned The Surgery Ship as an eight-episode series. Filming commenced on board the ship again in August 2016. The series was due for broadcast mid-2017 on National Geographic Channel.

The Africa Mercy hospital ship is run by non-governmental organisation "Mercy Ships", an international charity which has run hospital ships, primarily in West Africa since 1982. Mercy Ships offer surgical aid. Mercy Ships operates in primarily in West Africa, although recently it visited Madagascar for two field services.

The TV broadcast of The Surgery Ship garnered many positive reviews, including major Australian newspapers such as The Sydney Morning Herald, TV Tonight, News.com & Global Health Gateway.

The Surgery Ship single-feature documentary has been successful screening at multiple festivals and winning a number of awards including Best Film at the Sarasota International Film festival.

The Surgery Ship series was broadcast to strong critical support in 2017 on National Geographic People Channel  and won a number of awards including Best Human Interest Documentary at the Association for International Broadcasters (AIB)  and Best Direction in a Series at the ADG awards 

The Surgery Ship is produced by Media Stockade an independent film production company specialising in documentary films.

References 

Australian documentary films
2013 television films
2013 films
2010s English-language films